Nicolaas Jacobus Lee (born 13 March 1994 in Pretoria, South Africa) is a South African rugby union player for French Top 14 side . His regular position is centre.

Youth

Lee played schoolboy rugby for Afrikaanse Hoër Seunskool in Pretoria, but missed out on selection for the ' squad for the Craven Week competition in 2012.

In 2013, Lee moved to Bloemfontein where he represented the  side in the 2013 Under-21 Provincial Championship competition, making eleven starts during the season, scoring four tries and a penalty during the campaign.

Free State Cheetahs

He was included in the  squad for the 2014 Vodacom Cup competition. He made his first class debut in their round one match against  and marked the occasion by scoring a 55th minute try in a 52–47 victory. He remained a regular in a side for the duration of the competition, starting in all eight of their matches. He scored a total of six tries during the season, making him the Free State XV's joint top try scorer (along with Zingisa April).

In July 2014, Lee signed a new contract with the  until the end of 2017.

References

South African rugby union players
Living people
1994 births
Rugby union players from Pretoria
Free State Cheetahs players
Cheetahs (rugby union) players
CA Brive players
Rugby union centres